Huanglong County is a county of Yan'an, Shaanxi Province, China.

Administrative divisions 
The county is divided into 5 towns and 2 townships. The county's government offices are located in Shibao Town.

Geography 
A number of minor rivers run through the county. 87% of Huanglong County is forested, and the county is home to 1,012 species of plants and 225 species of animals.

Climate 

History 
A human skull fossil dating 50,000 years old was uncovered in the county. Other major archaeological digs include a number of Yangshao relics, dating back to the Neolithic Age. A number of preserved historic sites dot the county, such as stone carvings and grottoes from the Tang and Song Dynasties, ancient tombs from the Qin, Han, Ming, and Qing Dynasties, as well as a number of sites relevant to the Chinese Civil War.

Demographics 

Huanglong County's population demonstrated consistent growth from the 1940s through the 1970s, but has since been somewhat stable due to sizable migration towards more urban areas. The county is almost entirely Han Chinese in ethnicity, but is home to 11 minority groups. As of 2000, its second largest ethnic group is the Hui People, with 76 people; the county's third largest ethnic group is the Mongol People, with 67 people.

Economy 
Well-known products from Huanglong County include its walnuts, honey, and Chinese mitten crabs. The county has a walnut growing area 280,000 mu, yielding an annual output of 11,000 tons of walnuts. The county has an apple growing area of 144,000 mu, producing 65,000 tons of apples annually. There are 88,000 beehives in the county, producing 1,300 tons of honey annually. The county also has 430 mu of crab farms.

Transportation 
The G22 Qingdao-Lanzhou Expressway passes through the county, as well as the Yulan expressway, and another highway to neighboring Hancheng City.

References 

County-level divisions of Shaanxi
Yan'an